Miss Grand Nigeria was a Nigerian female beauty pageant founded in 2015 by a Lagos-based event organizer chaired by Loveth Ajufoh, QLA Nigeria. The winners of the contest, which was held individually twice (in 2015 and 2016), represented Nigeria at its parent competition, Miss Grand International. Previously, the contest's license belonged to AMC Productions, the organizer of the Miss Earth Nigeria pageant, before being transferred to QLA Nigeria Limited in 2015, and to 001 Entertainment, the organizer of another national pageant, The Nigerian Queen, in 2020.

Since the first debutant in 2014, Nigerian representatives obtained placements at the Miss Grand International pageant as one of the top 20 finalists twice; in 2021, and 2022.

History
Nigeria joined the Miss Grand International contest for the first time in 2014, represented by Tessy Kiri Bibowei who was appointed to the position by the Miss Earth Nigeria organization. Later in 2015, the license was transferred to the QLA Nigeria Limited, chaired by a business person Loveth Ajufoh who organized the inaugural contest of Miss Grand Nigeria contest on September 11, 2015 in Lagos. The contest featured fifteen national finalists which qualified to the national final round through a preliminary screening held on September 1, of whom the representative of the Plateau State, Ifeoma Jennifer Ohia, was elected the winner. The second edition was also held in the following year, but in 2017, only the virtual casting was conducted to determine the titleholder. QLA Nigeria Limited later terminated its partnership with Miss Grand International at the end of that year. 

The license was brought back to the organizer of the Miss Earth Nigeria pageant in 2019 and then to the Nigerian Queen organizer company, 001 Entertainment, in 2020. Since then, the winners of the Nigerian Queen contest have been assumed to be the Nigerian representatives for the Miss Grand International pageant, except for 2021, when the original titleholder, Abimbola Abayomi, was unable to compete internationally; the licensee then assigned her second runner-up to join the Miss Grand International 2021 instead. 

Since its first participation in 2014, Patience Christopher and Damilola Bolarinde were the only two Nigerian representatives to get placed at Miss Grand International; both of them were named as one of the top 20 finalists in 2021 and 2022, respectively.

Editions
The following list is the edition detail of the Miss Grand Nigeria contest, since its inception in 2015.

Representatives at Miss Grand International
Color keys

Gallery

References

External links

 

Nigeria
Beauty pageants in Nigeria
Recurring events established in 2015
2015 establishments in Nigeria
Nigerian awards